Douglas Abner Almeida dos Santos, known as Douglas Abner (born 30 January 1996) is a Brazilian professional footballer who plays as a forward.

Career
Douglas Abner made his Primeira Liga debut for Boavista on 1 November 2015 as a second-half substitute in a 0–1 loss to Marítimo.

References

Living people
1996 births
Brazilian footballers
Footballers from Brasília
Association football forwards
Primeira Liga players
Liga Portugal 2 players
Campeonato de Portugal (league) players
Ettan Fotboll players
Boavista F.C. players
Académico de Viseu F.C. players
S.C. Salgueiros players
FC Linköping City players
Brazilian expatriate footballers
Brazilian expatriate sportspeople in Portugal
Expatriate footballers in Portugal
Brazilian expatriate sportspeople in Sweden
Expatriate footballers in Sweden